Craig McLeod (born c. 1949) was a Canadian football player who played for the Calgary Stampeders and Winnipeg Blue Bombers. He won the Grey Cup with Calgary in 1971. He played college football at the University of Calgary.

References

1940s births
Living people
Players of Canadian football from Saskatchewan
Calgary Stampeders players
Winnipeg Blue Bombers players
Calgary Dinos football players
Canadian football linebackers
People from Moosomin, Saskatchewan